Air Liberté (later known as Air Lib) was an airline in France founded in July 1987. Air Liberté was headquartered in Rungis. Air Lib was headquartered in Orly Airport Building 363 in Paray-Vieille-Poste.

History
Air Liberté began operations in April 1988 with a leased MD-83. It mainly operated to destinations in European and Mediterranean holiday resorts, however it had some intercontinental routes. In 1991, Air Liberte published a joint timetable with French air carrier Minerve (airline) which was operating flights to San Francisco and Papeete, Tahiti as well as to Pointe a Pitre and Fort de France in the Caribbean at the time.  A route to Montreal was inaugurated in 1992, and Réunion and the Caribbean were also served by the airline. Unsuccessful routes included one from Toulouse to Dakar and London, which were scrapped in a conflict over slot allocations at Orly. 1996 saw a new route to Nice, and in May the route network of Euralair was taken on. Around 1996, the airline had a fleet of 5 Boeing 737-200 airplanes, 8 McDonnell Douglas MD-83 planes and 5 McDonnell Douglas DC-10 planes.

1996 also brought with it financial distress. The airline lost 1 billion FF ($181 million) that year, and in 1997 British Airways acquired 70% of the shareholding. At this time, British Airways brought Air Liberté together with TAT and inaugurated them under one management. Nouvelair was born out of Air Liberté's subsidiary in Tunisia, Air Liberté Tunisie. On 5 May 2000, BA sold Air Liberté to a partnership between Taitbout Antibes and Swissair.

On 25 March 2001 AOM French Airlines merged with Air Liberté, the airline retaining the name "Air Liberté". On 22 September 2001 the airline was renamed Air Lib But in October, Swissair went bankrupt, unable to make all scheduled payments. The French Government then granted a loan of €30.5 million to the company.

Despite government aid, the airline accumulated debts of €120 million and was forced to declare bankruptcy in August 2002. The government then ordered the implementation of a new restructuring plan before the end of the year. Several projects were considered without result, and the company was liquidated on 17 February 2003. As a result, no other competing international-level full-service French airline had appeared, leaving only Air France (now controlled by Air France–KLM) as a de facto monopoly.

Destinations

France 
 Agen – Agen La Garenne Airport
 Annecy – Annecy – Haute-Savoie – Mont Blanc Airport
 Aurillac – Aurillac – Tronquières Airport
 Bergerac – Bergerac Dordogne Périgord Airport
 Bordeaux – Bordeaux–Mérignac Airport
 Brive-la-Gaillarde – Brive–La Roche Airport
 Carcassonne – Carcassonne Airport
 Cherbourg-Octeville – Cherbourg – Maupertus Airport
 Épinal – Épinal – Mirecourt Airport
 Figari – Figari–Sud Corse Airport
 Lannion – Lannion – Côte de Granit Airport
 La Rochelle – La Rochelle – Île de Ré Airport
 Metz/Nancy – Metz–Nancy–Lorraine Airport
 Montpellier – Montpellier–Méditerranée Airport
 Nice – Nice Côte d'Azur Airport
 Paris – Orly Airport (hub)
 Perpignan – Perpignan–Rivesaltes Airport
 Roanne – Roanne-Renaison Airport
 Rodez – Rodez–Aveyron Airport
 Strasbourg – Strasbourg Airport
 Toulon – Toulon–Hyères Airport
 Toulouse – Toulouse–Blagnac Airport

French overseas departments and territories 
 Guadeloupe
 Pointe-à-Pitre – Pointe-à-Pitre International Airport
 Martinique
 Fort-de-France – Martinique Aimé Césaire International Airport
 Réunion
 Saint-Denis – Roland Garros Airport

International routes 
 
 Montréal
 Montréal–Dorval International Airport
 Montréal–Mirabel International Airport
 Toronto – Toronto Pearson International Airport
 
 Rome – Leonardo da Vinci–Fiumicino Airport
 
 Valletta – Malta International Airport
 
 Casablanca – Mohammed V International Airport
 
 Karachi – Jinnah International Airport
 
 Faro – Faro Airport
 Lisbon – Humberto Delgado Airport
 Porto – Francisco Sá Carneiro Airport
 
 Castries – Hewanorra International Airport
 
 Princess Juliana International Airport
 
 Alicante – Alicante–Elche Miguel Hernández Airport 
 Malaga – Malaga Airport
 
 Colombo – Bandaranaike International Airport
 
 Bangkok – Don Mueang International Airport
 
 Djerba – Djerba–Zarzis International Airport
 Tunis – Tunis–Carthage International Airport
 
 London – Heathrow Airport

Fleet 
Air Liberté operated the following aircraft during operations:

References 

 Hengi, BI. Airlines Worldwide. Leicester: Midland Publishing, 1997.
 Donald, David. The Encyclopedia of Civil Aircraft Etobicoke: Prospero Books, 1999.

External links

Airlines established in 1987
Defunct airlines of France
Airlines disestablished in 2003
1987 establishments in France
Former Oneworld affiliate members